The 1982–83 NBA season was the Detroit Pistons' 35th season in the NBA and 26th season in the city of Detroit.  The team played at the Pontiac Silverdome in surburban Pontiac, Michigan.

Expectations were high with the Pistons entering the season with hopes for continued improvement and a playoff berth, having improved from 16 to 21 to 39 wins in the previous three seasons, but the team regressed, finishing 37–45 (.451), 3rd in the Central Division.  The team was led on the season by guard Isiah Thomas (22.9 ppg, 7.8 apg, NBA All-Star), center Bill Laimbeer (13.6 ppg, 12.1 rpg, NBA All-Star) and forward Kelly Tripucka (26.5 ppg).  

With the disappointing record and frequent clashes with team leader Thomas, the team fired coach Scotty Robertson at the end of the season.  General Manager Jack McCloskey met with Robertson to deliver the news, "'I was very disappointed and very shocked,' Robertson said. 'I thought Jack and I would discuss various aspects of the team and go on from there.  He came in at noon and we talked for five minutes. 'We're going to make a change,' he said. He gave me two reasons. He said he didn't think the team had progressed enough this year and he said he didn't think our defense was as good as it should have been.  I told him I agreed with him on both points. But where we had a difference of opinion was why. He thought it was my fault and I thought it was the set of circumstances.'"  The team would hire Chuck Daly as his replacement for the 1983-84 Detroit Pistons season.

Draft picks

Roster

Regular season

Season standings

z – clinched division title
y – clinched division title
x – clinched playoff spot

Record vs. opponents

Awards and records
Isiah Thomas, All-NBA Second Team

References

See also
1982-83 NBA season

Detroit Pistons seasons
Det
Detroit Pistons
Detroit Pistons